Kalec is a former village in the Plzeň-North District of the Czech Republic, an administrative part of Žihle. The village was the site of several important events in the history of Bohemia.

History
Kalec's origins begin in the 13th century, it was a modest establishment with a bunker, inhabited by families of the low nobility formed during the middle age. Kalecs steps to be a part of the Monastery of Plasy caused disputes between several feudal entities until 1346. In the 14th century the monastery began to acquire properties in this establishment. During the period of the Battle of White Mountain in the 30 Years War against Sweden, Kalec was occupied several times, including by Emperor Frediand II.

Evžen Tyttl, in 1710–16, allowed the construction of a mansion in the "baroco" style. A small chapel was built for "Holy Daisy", after much negligence, Abbot Fortunato Hartmann rebuilt and designed the chapel after the Czech Italian architect Jan Santini Aichel's influence. The Inn at Kalec underwent a total rehabilitation and modernization in 1769.

In 1785, Kalec, after the approval from the Church, went to the dominions of Manětín and for the beginning of the 19th century it became part of Rabštejn nad Střelou. However, in 1787, the property was acquired by the Lazanský family.

Kalec had great relevance during the World War II due to its location, which is at a crucial part of the Edge of Sudetes Mountain or Sudetenland. The Sudetenland, along with the Sudetes Mountain was first taken by Hitler, after the war it restored by the Beneš decrees. With the formation of the Czechoslovakia state in 1918, the property was expropriated, and put under an agrarian reform which was put into the hands of a cooperative. In 1934, the property was acquired by Jaroslav Brček an industrialist from Plzeň.

The precise location of the buildings in rhombus, plus the complexity of the wooden structures and the vaulted buildings, constituted substantial reason for the admiration and studying of the students at the time. The most important structure is largely regarded as the castle, which is characterized as having five floors with leaned wings. In 1973, Dvůr Kalec had been declared a National Heritage. At the moment Kalec is having repairs done to the facade.

References

External links
Kalec
Sundial of Kalec
Sundial of Kalec View from backyard
Map of Revier Kaletz

Former villages in the Czech Republic
Populated places in Plzeň-North District
Buildings and structures in the Plzeň Region
Former populated places in the Czech Republic
Castles in the Plzeň Region